The remains of a wreck carrying cargo of Middle Bronze Age weapons was found in 1977 off Moor Sand, Gammon Head, South Hams, Devon, England. The site was designated under the Protection of Wrecks Act on 14 February 1978. The wreck is a Protected Wreck managed by Historic England

Wreck 
The site may represent the wreck of a prehistoric boat that sunk while carrying Middle Bronze Age weaponry including swords, palstaves, and other materials.

Discovery and investigation 
The site was identified in 1977 by trainee divers on a training course in Salcombe. Systematic searches in the following years identified further materials. The last artefact was recovered in 1982.

See also
Archaeology of shipwrecks
Underwater archaeology
List of designations under the Protection of Wrecks Act
Salcombe Cannon Wreck

References 

Protected Wrecks of England
Shipwrecks in the English Channel